JU may refer to:

Names and people
 Joo (Korean name), surname and given name (including a list of people with the name)
 Jū (鞠), Chinese surname
 Ru (surname), romanized Ju in Wade–Giles
 Ji Ju, a semi-legendary ancestor of the Zhou dynasty
 Ju (writer) (born 1958), Burmese writer
 Juh (c. 1825–1883), Apache leader

Places
 Ju (city), a city of the State of Qi during the Warring States Period of China
 Ju (state), a vassal state of the Zhou Dynasty
 Ju County (莒县), of Rizhao, Shandong, China
 Juan de Nova Island, administered by France (FIPS code JU)
 Zhou (country subdivision), pronounced ju in Korean
 Canton of Jura (created in 1979), newest of the 26 Swiss cantons

Businesses and organizations

Universities
 University of Jordan, located in Amman, Jordan
 Jacksonville University, a university in Jacksonville, Florida, United States
 Jadavpur University, a university in Kolkata, India
 Jahangirnagar University, a public university in Savar, Bangladesh
 Jilin University, in Changchun, Jilin, China
 Jain University, a university in Bangalore, India
 Jacobs University Bremen in Germany
 Jönköping University, in Jönköping, Sweden
 University of South Bohemia in České Budějovice, a public university in České Budějovice, Czech Republic

Other businesses and organizations
 Air Serbia, IATA airline code
 Junge Union, a conservative youth group in Germany
 Junkers, a German aircraft manufacturer
 joint undertaking, a kind of joint venture

Other uses
 Ju language (Chadic), spoken in Nigeria
 Ju languages, spoken in Botswana, Namibia and Angola
 The Principle of Ju, a philosophical concept in martial arts
 ju, a word for Korean alcoholic beverages